Thomas Bjørn (born 18 February 1971) is a professional golfer from Denmark who plays on the European Tour. He is the most successful Danish golfer to have played the game having won fifteen tournaments worldwide on the European Tour. In 1997 he also became the first Dane to qualify for a European Ryder Cup team. He captained the winning European side at the 2018 Ryder Cup.

Professional career
Bjørn started his career playing on the Challenge Tour from 1993 to 1995. In 1995 he won four tournaments on the Challenge Tour to earn his card for his debut year on the European Tour in 1996. Bjørn made his breakthrough immediately winning his maiden tour title in his debut season at the Loch Lomond World Invitational. He became the first golfer from Denmark to win a tournament on the European Tour. He finished the 1996 season placed tenth on the Order of Merit.

The follow up season in 1997 was steady with a number of top ten finishes without a win, however Bjørn did not have long to wait until his next win arrived. He won early in the 1998 season in Perth, Australia taking the Heineken Classic for his second European Tour title. Despite an over par final round of 74, Bjørn won by a single stroke from Ian Woosnam. In April 1998, after a five-week break from competitive golf, Bjørn won for the second time that year at the Peugeot Open de España after a final round 66 took him to 21 under and one stroke ahead of the chasing pack. He later said: "I didn’t really expect this after taking five weeks off, but when your confidence has gone like mine did after winning in Perth, it just shows it’s best to take a break and regroup." After his two wins he finished the year 6th on the Order of Merit.

After a winless period due to injuries and the birth of his first child, Bjørn returned to the winner's circle in October 1999 at the Sarazen World Open. This was his fourth career European Tour win and after an unspectacular year, he jumped up the standings to finish the season 14th on the Order of Merit.

He has finished in the top ten on the Order of Merit eight times with a best finish of fifth in 2000. He has come close to winning a major championship at the 2003 Open Championship when he was in the lead with 4 holes to play before a slump handed victory to Ben Curtis. At the 2005 PGA Championship, he was tied for the lead before finishing as runner-up to Phil Mickelson in a second-place tie with Steve Elkington.

Bjørn picked up his first European Tour win in four years and 10th of his career in 2010 at the Estoril Open de Portugal, winning with a score of 23-under-par, five better than Richard Green. He followed this with three more wins at the Commercialbank Qatar Masters in February 2011, Johnnie Walker Championship at Gleneagles in August 2011, winning in a five-man playoff on the fifth extra hole, birdieing the final three holes and Omega European Masters in September 2011. In December 2013, Bjørn won the Nedbank Golf Challenge in South Africa. It was Bjørn's 14th career European Tour win.

Bjørn was a member of the winning European Ryder Cup teams in 1997, 2002 and 2014. He also captained the 2018 European Ryder Cup team, winning over United States with 17½ points to 10½ at Le Golf National, Paris, France.

He made the top 10 of the Official World Golf Ranking for one week in 2001 after a second-place finish at the Scottish Open at Loch Lomond.

In 2005 and 2006, Bjørn sponsored the Thomas Bjørn Open, an event on the Challenge Tour played in his home country. In 2007, Bjørn was elected chairman of the European Tour's tournament committee. In May 2022, Bjørn was named vice-captain by Team Europe's captain Henrik Stenson for the 2023 Ryder Cup in Rome.

Bjørn's last name is sometimes written Björn or Bjorn outside Denmark. The Danish (and Norwegian) letter 'ø' represents approximately the same sound as 'ö' in German and Swedish. Literally translated, his surname means bear in Danish.

Personal life
Bjørn has three children, Filippa and twins Oliver and Julia with his former wife Pernilla. Bjørn currently resides in London. Perth-born air stewardess Dagmara Leniartek had a five-year affair with Bjørn. Bjørn initially cut relations with Leniartek and denied he was the father of her daughter. However, Danish media reported a DNA test had subsequently proved Bjørn was the father of the child – a girl named Isabella.

Bjørn is a football fan and a keen follower of Liverpool F.C. Alongside football he also states his other interest to be movies.

Professional wins (23)

European Tour wins (15)

1Co-sanctioned by the Asian Tour
2Co-sanctioned by the Sunshine Tour

European Tour playoff record (3–2)

Japan Golf Tour wins (2)

Japan Golf Tour playoff record (1–0)

Challenge Tour wins (3)

Other wins (1)

Other playoff record (1–1)

European Senior Tour wins (2) 

European Senior Tour playoff record (1–0)

Results in major championships

CUT = missed the half-way cut
"T" = tied

Summary

Most consecutive cuts made – 6 (1999 Open Championship – 2000 PGA)
Longest streak of top-10s – 2 (2000 Open Championship – 2000 PGA)

Results in The Players Championship

CUT = missed the halfway cut
WD = withdrew
"T" indicates a tie for a place

Results in World Golf Championships
Results not in chronological order prior to 2015.

1Cancelled due to 9/11

WD = Withdrew
QF, R16, R32, R64 = Round in which player lost in match play
"T" = Tied
NT = No tournament
Note that the HSBC Champions did not become a WGC event until 2009.

Team appearances
Amateur
Jacques Léglise Trophy (representing the Continent of Europe): 1988
European Youths' Team Championship (representing Denmark): 1990
St Andrews Trophy (representing the Continent of Europe): 1990
European Amateur Team Championship (representing Denmark): 1991
Eisenhower Trophy (representing Denmark): 1992

Professional
World Cup (representing Denmark): 1996, 1997, 2001, 2006, 2013
Ryder Cup (representing Europe): 1997 (winners), 2002 (winners), 2014 (winners), 2018 (non-playing captain) (winners)

Seve Trophy (representing Continental Europe): 2000 (winners), 2002, 2003, 2005, 2007, 2009 (non-playing captain), 2011, 2013 (winners)
Royal Trophy (representing Europe): 2006 (winners)
EurAsia Cup (representing Europe): 2014, 2018 (non-playing captain, winners)

See also
List of golfers with most European Tour wins

References

External links

Danish male golfers
European Tour golfers
Ryder Cup competitors for Europe
People from Silkeborg
Sportspeople from Gothenburg
1971 births
Living people